Yoann de Boer (born 27 January 1982) is a French former professional footballer who played as a defensive midfielder for FC Eindhoven, FC Den Bosch, Fortuna Sittard and Kozakken Boys.

External links
 Voetbal International profile 

1982 births
Living people
French footballers
FC Eindhoven players
FC Den Bosch players
Fortuna Sittard players
Eerste Divisie players
Derde Divisie players
French expatriate footballers
Expatriate footballers in the Netherlands
French expatriate sportspeople in the Netherlands
Footballers from Marseille
Association football midfielders